Music of My Life is a 1996 compilation album by Jo Stafford.

Track listing 

 "The Night We Called It a Day"
 "Georgia on My Mind"
 "Day by Day"
 "Candy"
 "If It Takes Me All My Life"
 "The One I Love (Belongs to Somebody Else)"
 "I'll Never Smile Again"
 "Tennessee Waltz" 
 "On the Alamo"
 "Sunday Kind of Love"
 "All the Things You Are"
 "What'cha Know Joe?"

References

External links 
 [ Music of My Life] at AllMusic

1996 compilation albums
Jo Stafford compilation albums
Corinthian Records albums